Djerv (Majuscule: Ꙉ, Minuscule: ꙉ) is one of the Cyrillic alphabet letters that was used in Old Cyrillic. It exists in the Cyrillic Extended-B table as U+A648 and U+A649. It is the basis of the modern letters Ћ and Ђ; the former was in fact a direct revival of djerv and was considered the same letter.

Djerv was also commonly used in Serbian Cyrillic, where it was an officially used letter.

Spelling Reforms and forming of the letters Ћ and Ђ
The letter Ђ was formed in 1818 by Vuk Stefanović Karadžić after several proposals of reforming Djerv by  Lukijan Mušicki and Gligorije Geršić. However the letter Ћ (also based on djerv) was first used by Dositej Obradović in a direct reform of djerv.

Computing codes

References

Cyrillic letters